A betting pool, syndicate, sports lottery, sweep, or office pool if done at work, is a form of gambling, specifically a variant of parimutuel betting influenced by lotteries, where gamblers pay a fixed price into a pool (from which taxes and a house "take" or "vig" are removed), and then make a selection on an outcome, usually related to sport. In an informal game, the vig is usually quite small or non-existent. The pool is evenly divided between those that have made the correct selection. There are no odds involved; each winner's payoff depends simply on the number of gamblers and the number of winners. (True parimutuel betting, which was historically referred to as pool betting, involves both odds calculations and variable wager amounts.)

Betting pools are not connected only to sports, as there are topics such as deaths and births which people can bet on. Death pools usually involve well-known individuals, such as celebrities and sports figures, which the participants predict will die within a certain period of time. On the other hand, birth pools involve individuals picking specific dates in which someone, who can be either a celebrity or friend, gives birth.

History
The concept was introduced in Britain in 1923 by Littlewoods Pools where it was known as toto and based on football matches.

Today
Today in England, sports lotteries are more commonly referred to as football pools. American sports lotteries often do not require contestants to purchase a lottery ticket or make an initial wager. Hockey pools are common in North America, and footy tipping in Australia.

In the United States the most popular type of betting pool is the March Madness pools. Leading up to the NCAA Men's Division I Basketball Championship, contestants fill out forms that predict who will win. In 2013 it was estimated that 58 million Americans participate in the contest every year. There are also many handicappers and pundits which offer advice for winning your bracket. Another popular type of betting pool is the college football bowl game. Millions of people bet on the winners of all 39 bowl games every year. There are also notable sport betting pools across the globe such as Hollywoodbets, American Totalisator, Sport Select and others.

A traditional betting pool takes place during the Super Bowl, where entrants make random picks for the score of the game. These entries are known as "squares" where players either pick or are assigned a cell in a 10 by 10 grid.  Then after the grid is filled, the rows and columns are assigned a digit (0-9) which corresponds to the final number in the score of each team.  The player with the correct combination wins, and prizes may be paid out for having the correct score at the end of the game, at the halftime and for each quarter.

See also
Arbitrage betting
Tote betting
Fixed-odds betting
Financial betting
Sports betting
Sports betting systems

References

Sports betting
Gambling games
Wagering
Gambling terminology